Palchuram or The Milky Mountain Road is mountain village and hairpin road near Mananthavady town in Wayanad district of Kerala state in India.

Location
There is a spiral hairpin road here going all the way down to Kottiyoor in Kannur district.

Post office
There is a post office at Ambayathode and the pin code is 674651

Education
 St George LP School, Ambayathode, Kottiyoor
 St George UP School, Ambayathode, Kottiyoor
 IJMHS Kottiyoor

Tourist attraction
The Palchuram Hairpin Bends attract many tourists for the photographic options it offers.  There are a few temples and churches in the area.

The footpath to the falls is quiet dangerous and tiring.

Image gallery

See also
 Thavinchal
 Thalappuzha

References

Mananthavady Area